In Concert with the Danish National Concert Orchestra and Choir, by Procol Harum, is a live album released 2009. It was recorded in Ledreborg Castle in Denmark.

This album is also noteworthy because it contains a song that Procol Harum have never released before - "Symphathy [sic] for the Hard of Hearing". This is a song about the Second World War that was previously on Gary Brooker's solo album "Lead Me to the Water". The Rest Tracks are from the DVD, but not on the CD. The CD has 10 Songs, but the track list here is from DVD.

Track listing
"Grand Hotel" (Gary Brooker, Keith Reid) - 7:21
"Something Magic" (Brooker, Reid) - 4:00
"Butterfly Boys" (Gary Brooker, Keith Reid) - 4:48 (DVD Track)
"Homburg" (Brooker, Reid) - 5:00
"The VIP Room" (Brooker, Reid) - 4:43 (DVD Track)
"Fires (Which Burnt Brightly)" (Brooker, Reid) - 5:55
"Nothing But the Truth"  (Brooker, Reid) - 3:51 (DVD Track)
"Into the Flood" (Brooker, Noble, Reid) - 5:54
"Simple Sister"(Brooker, Reid) - 4:48 (DVD Track)
"A Salty Dog" (Brooker, Reid) - 6:30
"An Old English Dream" (Brooker, Reid) - 5:14 (DVD Track)
"Symphathy for the Hard of Hearing" (Brooker) - 8:10
"A Whiter Shade of Pale" (Brooker, Matthew Fisher, Reid) - 8:47
"Whaling Stories" (Brooker, Reid) - 10:15
"Conquistador" (Brooker, Reid) - 5:20

Personnel
Procol Harum
 Gary Brooker - piano and vocals 
 Mark Brzezicki- drums
 Matt Pegg - bass guitar
 Josh Phillips - organ
 Geoff Whitehorn - guitar
 Keith Reid - lyrics

References

https://www.discogs.com/de/Procol-Harum-In-Concert-With-The-Danish-National-Concert-Orchestra-Choir/release/4777449 - Information for DVD

External links
 ProcolHarum.com - ProcolHarum.com's page for this album
  - DVD to buying at amazon.com
  - Watching the full Concert at youtube.com

Procol Harum albums
2009 live albums
Collaborative albums